Ribera Navarra Fútbol Sala is a futsal club based in Tudela, a city in the autonomous community of Navarre, Spain. It was founded in 2001 and its pavilion is Ciudad de Tudela with a capacity of 1,200.

Sponsors
OPDE - (2009–2010)
Ríos Renovables - (2010–2014)
Aspil - (2014–present)

Squad

Season to season

11 seasons in Primera División
2 seasons in Segunda División
3 seasons in Segunda División B
5 seasons in Tercera División

References

External links
Official website
Profile at LNFS.es

Futsal clubs in Spain
Futsal clubs established in 2001
2001 establishments in Spain
Sports teams in Navarre